La Muchacha del cuerpo de oro is a 1967 Argentine film.

Cast
 Thelma Tixou
 Enzo Viena
 Fernando Siro
 Héctor Pellegrini
 Alba Múgica
 Nina Pontier (birth name: Nina Pontoriero)

External links
 

1967 films
Argentine drama films
1960s Spanish-language films
1960s Argentine films